The men's pole vault at the 1966 European Athletics Championships was held in Budapest, Hungary, at Népstadion on 31 August and 2 September 1966.

Medalists

Results

Final
2 September

Qualification
31 August

Participation
According to an unofficial count, 27 athletes from 15 countries participated in the event.

 (1)
 (1)
 (3)
 (1)
 (2)
 (3)
 (1)
 (1)
 (2)
 (3)
 (2)
 (1)
 (3)
 (1)
 (2)

References

Pole vault
Pole vault at the European Athletics Championships